= Alireza Ghasemi Farzad =

Iranian politician (born 1966)

Governor-general of Hamadan
- In office 20 October 2021 – 29 September 2024
- President: Ebrahim Raisi
- Preceded by: Saeed Shahrokhi
- Succeeded by: Hamid Mollanouri Shamsi

Personal details
- Born: 1966 (age 59–60) Hamadan, Iran
- Party: Principlist

Alireza Ghasemi Farzad (Persian: علیرضا قاسمی فرزاد, born 1966) is an Iranian conservative politician who formerly served as the Governor General of Hamadan Province.
